Qianku is a Town under the jurisdiction of Cangnan County, Wenzhou City, Zhejiang Province, People's Republic of China. Located in the center of Jiangnanyang Plain in Cangnan County, with an area of 62.86 square kilometers and a population of 127,000 (2017), it has jurisdiction over Yangtou, Qianqianjin, Hengjie, Dongxi Street, Jinjiayang, Sanshiqiao communities, Xiakou and Xiangqiao, Xin'an, Xianju, Kuoshan, Chengnan, Chengbei districts, a total of 47 administrative villages.

Qianku Town is known as a water town in the south of the Yangtze River due to its pleasant climate, beautiful environment and dense river network. Geographically, it is connected to Longgang City in the east, Wangli Town in the west, Yishan Town in the north, and Jinxiang Town and Chixi Town in the south. Existing Longjin Avenue and G1523 Ningbo-Dongguan Expressway. 228 National Highway, S216 Lin'an-Cangnan Expressway, Rui-Cang Expressway Qianku Section are under construction.

Qianku Town was selected as the fourth batch of provincial-level small city cultivation pilot towns in Zhejiang Province, and successively won the luggage industry production base (national gold name card), China's comprehensive utilization of waste textile pilot base, Wenming Town, Zhejiang Province, Zhejiang Province Educational Strong Town, Zhejiang Province Provincial Sports Town, Zhejiang Province Ecological Civilization Town, Zhejiang Science Popularization Demonstration Town, Zhejiang Province-level Central Town, Zhejiang Province "New Countryside Impact Broadcasting" TV boosts ten characteristic towns, Zhejiang Province Happy Small Towns, Zhejiang Province Health Towns, Honorary titles such as Forest Towns in Zhejiang Province. In November 2020, Qianku Town became the fourth batch of small cities cultivation pilot in Zhejiang.

History 
As early as the Qianyou period of the Hou Han Dynasty (948-950 AD), the king of Wuyue Qian Hongchu once set up a coffer here to levy local taxes on tea, salt, cotton, and silk. In the early years of the Republic of China, the Qianku District was established, and it was originally called "Qianku".

In 2019, Qianku Town covers an area of 62.89 square kilometers, governs 6 communities, 7 districts, and 47 administrative villages.

Manichean traditions 

Qianku was an ancient center of Manichaeism and is quite close to Cao'an the last surviving temple and to this day continues to have some remnant traditions on the 1st and 15th days of the lunar month many locals do the following:
 Eat vegetarian on those days. The dishes served are mainly pickles, green vegetables, shiitake mushrooms, fungus, day lily, etc. Any miscellaneous food including animal oils and so on.
 Burning incense and worshipping on those days
 Avoiding using feces or urine for fertilizer on those days. In the 1980s-1990s the peasants placed the urine bucket on the side of the road to make it convenient for passers-by. If it is almost full, it must be disposed of early. Especially on the day before the first and fifteenth day of the new year, the inspection must be carried out. If it is a little full, it must be processed in advance, and rainy days are no exception.
 People avoid travel on these days, however, this norm is fading
 People often choose these days as auspicious days to plan events, doctor's appointments, opening businesses, marrying. This approach is costly and time-consuming. In the past, some people in the Qianku area used to have a catchphrase: "You don't need to turn over the books on the first and fifteenth day of the middle school."
There is a custom of fishermen eating three bites of white rice a day. These three bites of white rice represent vegetarian meals for three meals a day. This is similar to the welcoming activity of the Manichaeans worshipping Lin Peng in Xiapu, where farmers used three small cups of white rice to worship the gods.

There is also the custom of wearing plain white clothes to honor the dead among the people in the Qianku area. This is the relic of the Manichaean believers' custom of white clothes and white crowns.

There is also a strong veneration of the Sun and the Moon, which are often called the Sunlight Buddha and Moonlight Buddha by locals.

See also 
 Cangnan County
 Cangnan Stele
 Cao'an
 Chinese Manichaeism

References 

Cangnan County
Township-level divisions of Zhejiang